Conus sydneyensis is a species of sea snail, a marine gastropod mollusk in the family Conidae, the cone snails and their allies.

Like all species within the genus Conus, these snails are predatory and venomous. They are capable of "stinging" humans, therefore live ones should not be handled at all, except by qualified federal animal control personnel.

Description
Length of the shell varies between 21mm and 35mm, weighs medium with slightly convex or straight sides.

Distribution
This marine species is endemic to Australia and occurs off New South Wales.

References

 Sowerby, G.B. (3rd) 1887. Thesaurus Conchyliorum. Supplements to the Monograph of Conus and Voluta. Vol. 5 249–279, pls 29–36.
 Röckel, D., Korn, W. & Kohn, A.J. 1995. Manual of the Living Conidae. Volume 1: Indo-Pacific Region. Wiesbaden : Hemmen 517 pp.
 Petit, R. E. (2009). George Brettingham Sowerby, I, II & III: their conchological publications and molluscan taxa. Zootaxa. 2189: 1–218
 Puillandre N., Duda T.F., Meyer C., Olivera B.M. & Bouchet P. (2015). One, four or 100 genera? A new classification of the cone snails. Journal of Molluscan Studies. 81: 1–23

External links
 The Conus Biodiversity website
 Cone Shells – Knights of the Sea
 

sydneyensis
Gastropods described in 1887
Gastropods of Australia